Bodemeister (foaled April 28, 2009) is a Thoroughbred race horse who won the 2012 Arkansas Derby and finished second to I'll Have Another in the 2012 Kentucky Derby and 2012 Preakness Stakess. He went on to become the sire of 2017 Kentucky Derby winner Always Dreaming.

Background
Bodemeister is a Bay horse with a white blaze. He was named after Bode Baffert, the son of his trainer, Bob Baffert . His pedigree includes notable horses such as his grandsire Unbridled and his damsire Storm Cat. The colt was sired by the Belmont Stakes winner Empire Maker out of the mare Untouched Talent. He was sold as a yearling at the Keeneland September sales for $260,000.

Racing career
Bodemeister did not race as a 2-year-old, but emerged as a 3-year-old to come in second in the 2012 San Felipe Stakes, then win the Arkansas Derby.

Bodemeister was widely considered one of the favorites to win the 2012 Kentucky Derby. Ridden by jockey Mike Smith 
Bodemeister led the Kentucky Derby from the start until 150 yards remained, when he was overtaken by I'll Have Another, leaving Bodemeister to finish in second place. The race came five weeks after Baffert was hospitalized in Dubai due to a heart attack.

Bodemeister was made favorite ahead of I'll Have Another by odds-makers in the 2012 Preakness Stakes on 19 May. The race developed in similar fashion to the Kentucky Derby, with Bodemeister leading until the final 50 yards, when he was caught by I'll Have Another and finished second by a neck.

Baffert announced afterward that Bodemeister would not race in the 2012 Belmont Stakes. On August 21 it was announced that Bodemeister had been diagnosed with an injury to his left shoulder and would retire to stud.

Stud career

Bodemeister entered stud at WinStar Farm in Versailles, Kentucky for the 2013 breeding season. His first foals reached racing age in 2016. Bodemeister saw his first winner on May 11, 2016 when gray filly Bode's Dream won a maiden race at Gulfstream Park.

Bodemeister made the news when an unusual white-headed colt with splashed white markings was born on June 5, 2016, later named Southern Phantom. "In 35 years in the industry I've never seen a Thoroughbred like this," said trainer Eric Guillot. "The mare hasn't thrown anything unusual before, but Bodemeister throws a lot of white. I've got a few by him with stockings and other markings, but this one's unique. It looks like he dunked his head into a five-gallon bucket of white paint."

Bodemeister's stud fee for 2017 was originally $25,000, but the fee was removed after Always Dreaming won Kentucky Derby 143. 

He is the sire of 2017 Kentucky Derby winner Always Dreaming from his first crop of foals,  as well as stakes-placed runners O Dionysus, American Anthem, Bode's Dream, Dharmaster, and the filly Kenda.

Pedigree

 Bodemeister is inbred 4 × 4 to the stallion Northern Dancer, meaning that the latter appears twice in the fourth generation of his pedigree.

References

External links
Bodemeister profile (Kentucky Derby)
Bodemeister profile (Preakness Stakes)

2009 racehorse births
Racehorses bred in Virginia
Racehorses trained in the United States
Thoroughbred family 1-nhttps://www.tjk.org/TR/Yetistiricilik/Static/Page/Aygirlar